Bedazzled were a British indie pop group active in the early 1990s.  Originating from Gloucestershire, and formed from the ashes of Apple Mosaic (led by Ian Dench, later of EMF), the band were signed to Columbia Records and comparable to other organ-led indie dance/pop acts of the era such as Airhead and The Dylans.  After several singles (including "Summer Song" and "Teenage Mother Superior") and the 1992 album Sugarfree, they disbanded.

References

External links
 Bedazzled entry at Discogs

English rock music groups